Lakeland Square Mall is a shopping mall located on the northern side of Lakeland, Florida. It is one of two enclosed malls serving Polk County and the only shopping mall located off of I-4 between Tampa and Orlando. It is currently anchored by Dillard's, Resale America, J. C. Penney, Urban Air Adventure Park, and Cinemark Theatres.  

When it opened, it was anchored by Mervyn's, Sears, and Belk, with Maison Blanche opening shortly thereafter. J. C. Penney was added to the mall in 1990, followed by Burdines in 1994, both relocated from downtown Lakeland. Mervyn's was replaced by Dillard's in 1997. Maison Blanche opened in the following year with their purchase of Mercantile Stores Company, Inc. Burdines became Burdines-Macy's in 2004, and fully converted to Macy's in 2005. Belk closed later that year with the opening of a new location in Lakeside Village. It was replaced by a Burlington Coat Factory in the Fall of 2007. In 2012, Dillard's closed with operations consolidated to the former Maison Blanche store. The vacant anchor tenant of Mervyn's was demolished in 2012 for the construction of a new 12-screen Cinemark Theaters and Sports Authority, which opened the following year in 2013.

In 2015, the Sears property was one of 235 properties sold by Sears Holdings to Seritage Growth Properties. Sports Authority closed with the rest of the chain in 2016, with the space later being filled by Urban Air Adventure Park in August 2018. Macy's closed in 2017, with the space being taken over by Resale America in November 2019. Sears also closed in 2018, as part of a 142 store closure round. Charlotte Russe also reopened at the mall as part of the chain's 100 store openings in 2019, after closing earlier that year. In 2022 Burlington closed its doors, moving across the street to the Shoppes of Lakeland shopping center.

References

External links
 

1988 establishments in Florida
Buildings and structures in Lakeland, Florida
Brookfield Properties
Shopping malls established in 1988
Shopping malls in Florida
Tourist attractions in Polk County, Florida